The 129th Pennsylvania Volunteer Infantry was an infantry regiment that served in the Union Army during the American Civil War.

Service
The 129th Pennsylvania Infantry was organized at Camp Curtin near Harrisburg, Pennsylvania, and mustered in August 15, 1862 under the command of Colonel Jacob Gellert Frick.

The regiment was attached to 1st Brigade, 3rd Division, V Corps, Army of the Potomac.

The 129th Pennsylvania Infantry mustered out May 18, 1863.

Detailed service
Moved to Washington, D.C., August 16, and duty there until September 12. Moved to Sharpsburg, Md and duty there until October 30. Reconnaissance from Sharpsburg to Smithfield, Va., October 16–17. Movement to Falmouth, Va., October 30 – November 19. Battle of Fredericksburg, Va., December 12–15. Burnside's 2nd Campaign, "Mud March," January 20–24, 1863. At Falmouth until April. Chancellorsville Campaign April 27 – May 6. Battle of Chancellorsville May 1–5.

Casualties
The regiment lost a total of 83 men during service; 3 officers and 37 enlisted men killed or mortally wounded, 1 officer and 42 enlisted men died of disease.

Commanders
 Colonel Jacob Gellert Frick

Notable members
 Private Charles F. Chidsey – First mayor of Easton, Pennsylvania, member of the Pennsylvania House of Representatives
 Colonel Jacob Gellert Frick – Medal of Honor recipient for action at the Battle of Chancellorsville

See also

 List of Pennsylvania Civil War Units
 Pennsylvania in the Civil War

References
 Armstrong, William H. Red-Tape and Pigeon-Hole Generals: As Seen from the Ranks During a Campaign in the Army of the Potomac (New York: Carleton), 1864. (Reprinted in 1999)
 First Reunion of the One Hundred and Twenty-ninth Regiment, Pennsylvania volunteers, Held at Easton, Pennsylvania, August 14, 1884 (Easton, PA: Free Press Pub. House), 1885.
 Dyer, Frederick H. A Compendium of the War of the Rebellion (Des Moines, IA: Dyer Pub. Co.), 1908.
Attribution

External links
 National and state flags of the 129th Pennsylvania Infantry
 Wynn, Jake. "Colonel Jacob Frick and the 129th Pennsylvania at the Battle of Fredericksburg" (video). Pennsylvania in the Civil War, May 21, 2020.

Military units and formations established in 1862
Military units and formations disestablished in 1863
Units and formations of the Union Army from Pennsylvania